Oleksandr Georgiyovych Tarnavskyi is a Ukrainian brigadier general who rose to prominence during the Russian invasion of Ukraine.

Military Service
Tarnavskyi became the Deputy Commander of Operational Command East (Unit A1314) in mid-2022. Shortly thereafter, Tarnavskyi would command the Sloboda group. Tarnavskyi later assumed command of Kherson, an operational-strategic grouping of troops that was active in the 2022 Kherson counteroffensive, which resulted in the liberation of Kherson.

Awards
Tarnavskyi has received the Order of Bohdan Khmelnytsky three times.

References

Ukrainian military officers
Ukrainian military leaders